Jak Airport (born Jack Stafford; c. 1955 – 13 August 2004) was the guitarist of 1970s punk band X-Ray Spex and new wave band Classix Nouveaux, before retiring from music and working for Vision Video and the BBC.

Born and raised in Catford, London, Jak Airport is best known and remembered for being a member of punk rock band X-Ray Spex, contributing with songs like "Oh Bondage Up Yours!" and "The Day The World Turned Day-Glo".

The beginning riff of the latter song was considered a classic by the band's singer Poly Styrene. He joined the band after leaving another punk group called Puncture. When X-Ray Spex disbanded in 1979, he and the group's bassist Paul Dean formed Airport and Dean.

In 1979, he and fellow X-Ray Spex member, drummer BP Hurding formed, alongside singer Sal Solo, the new wave band Classix Nouveaux, but he had left the band by the end of the year. He retired from the music industry then worked at VVL London and also in the BBC's corporate and public relations department.

Death
Jack Stafford died of cancer on 13 August 2004.

References

English male guitarists
English new wave musicians
People from Catford
1950s births
2004 deaths
Musicians from Kent
Deaths from cancer in England
Place of death missing
Date of birth unknown
X-Ray Spex members
Classix Nouveaux members
20th-century British guitarists
20th-century British male musicians
20th-century British musicians